Aburi Girls' Senior High School, formerly Aburi Girls' Secondary School, also known as ABUGISS, is a Presbyterian  senior high boarding school for girls located south of Aburi in the Eastern Region of Ghana.

The brother school of Aburi Girls is Presbyterian Boys' Secondary School, known as "PRESEC".

History

Aburi Girls Senior High School was formally established as a secondary school for girls in 1946  with only seven students;.

However, its origin dates as far back as 1852, when the Basel Missionaries opened a school at primary level for girls at their mission station inside the town. The primary school continued until its takeover by the Scottish Mission during the World War I. In the 1920s the training of teachers was begun alongside a kindergarten section and a middle school, also for girls, and in 1946, secondary classes were introduced side by side with the teacher-training course.

In 1950 the Presbyterian Church of the Gold Coast (now Ghana) took over the Management of the school when its partner missions the Basel Mission and the Scottish Mission left. The secondary school was physically separated from the teacher training classes and moved to its present site on its present site on the outskirts of Aburi in 1954. Classes ran from Form 1 to Form 5 until 1958, when a Sixth Form was added. Presently the 3-year Senior High School system is run.

In 1972, the Methodist Training College located on the southern side of the school was closing down so Joyce Asibey, the first Ghanaian Headmistress initiated negotiations with the Methodist Church to acquire the college premises for the school. The compound had a dining hall, dormitory and classrooms and so it was used to house form one students. This was done to reduce the incidence of bullying. Due to the increase in numbers in the 1990s, this arrangement was stopped and the old “Metico” building is now bonafide house known as Irene Anderson House just as the entire compound.
The school is located on the easternmost part of the ridge forming the Akuapem Mountains, about a mile to the south of Aburi.

Global Robotics Competition 
A total of 12 students from the Aburi Girls Senior High School will be representing Ghana at the first ever Global Robotics Competition.

Houses 
The school currently has eight houses, named as follows:
 Aberdeen House
 Irene Anderson House
 Sylvia Asempa House
 Barradale House
 Chapel House
 Edinburgh House
 Kilsyth House
 Royal Park House

Programmes offered 
Below are academic programmes offered in the school:
 Business
 Visual Arts
 Home Economics
 General Science
 General  Arts

Achievements 
Between 2011 and 2015, the school cleared the top awards in two categories in the West African Senior School Certificate Examination (WASSCE) winning Best in Mathematics and Science. Also in 2015, the school won the three top awards in the National Best School and Best Teacher Awards for the Senior High School Division for the Eastern Region.

Notable alumni

 Akosua Adomako Ampofo, Ghanaian academic, sociologist and professor of Gender studies and African studies at the University of Ghana
 Senyuiedzorm Awusi Adadevoh, photojournalist
 Vida Akoto-Bamfo, justice of the Supreme Court of Ghana (2009 – 2019)
 Gloria Akuffo, current Attorney-general of Ghana and Minister of Justice 
 Sylvia Anie, chemist, Fellow of the Royal Society of Chemistry, received an award from the Old Students Association of Aburi Girls’ Senior High School recognizing her contributions to scientific knowledge.
 Francisca Ashietey-Odunton, journalist, broadcaster and diplomat
 Ivy Barley, Ghanaian entrepreneur 
 Veronica Bekoe, Ghanaian Biological scientist, inventor of Veronica Bucket 
 Abena Brigidi, investment analyst author and speaker
 Esi Awuah, Ghanaian academic;foundation vice chancellor of the University of Energy and Natural Resources, Ghana
 Matilda Baffour Awuah, Security expert, former Director General of the Ghana Prisons Service
 Christine Alexandra Clerk, physician and epidemiologist 
 Nuong Faalong, Ghanaian journalist, activist, and actress 
 Elsie Effah Kaufmann, current Host of the National Science and Math Quiz and biomedical engineering scholar 
 Lovelace Johnson, active Justice of the Supreme Court of Ghana (2019–)
 Ofie Kodjoe, American-Ghanaian singer, actress, radio presenter and motivational speaker
 Deloris Frimpong Manso, entrepreneur, television and radio show host, producer, public speaker and Women's Advocate
 Ernestina Naadu Mills, educator and former First Lady of Ghana 
 Ellen Serwaa Nee-Whang, retired Ghanaian diplomat
 Abena Oduro, Vice Dean of the Faculty of Social Science at the University of Ghana
 Rose Constance Owusu, justice of the Supreme Court of Ghana (2008 – 2014)
 Akosua Adoma Perbi, Ghanaian author and history professor
 Cina Soul, singer-songwriter and recording artist
 Johanna Odonkor Svanikier, diplomat
 Theresa Amerley Tagoe, Ghanaian politician

References

External links 
 Official websiteundergoing redevelopment as of March 2021.

Boarding schools in Ghana
Girls' schools in Ghana
High schools in Ghana
Presbyterian schools in Africa
Educational institutions established in 1946
1946 establishments in Gold Coast (British colony)
Christian schools in Ghana
Public schools in Ghana
Education in the Eastern Region (Ghana)